Thale Sofie Kielland Bjerk (born 19 August 2000) is a Norwegian professional racing cyclist, who most recently rode for UCI Women's Continental Team .

References

External links

2000 births
Living people
Norwegian female cyclists
Place of birth missing (living people)